is a Japanese footballer who plays for Giravanz Kitakyushu.

Club statistics
Updated to 23 February 2020.

1Includes J2/J3 Play-offs.

References

External links

Profile at Tochigi SC

1992 births
Living people
Waseda University alumni
Association football people from Tokyo
Japanese footballers
J2 League players
J3 League players
V-Varen Nagasaki players
Tochigi SC players
Vanraure Hachinohe players
Giravanz Kitakyushu players
Association football forwards